Halfdan Marinius Hanson (November 30, 1884 – September 12, 1952) was a Norwegian-born American architect.

He was born in Tønsberg in Vestfold, Norway. He emigrated as an infant to Gloucester, Massachusetts, where his father was a ship's rigger. 
In 1904, he completed a correspondence course in architecture from a program based in Philadelphia, Pennsylvania.

Hanson had a longtime collaboration with interior designer Henry Davis Sleeper, the owner of the Beauport in Gloucester, Massachusetts. 
 He was an architect in the employment of Sleeper for twenty-seven years. He was also the architect of or contributor to over 100 properties principally within greater Boston area including the communities of Gloucester, Rockport, Manchester, Beverly and Newton.
 Other notable properties designed by Hanson include Our Lady of Good Voyage Church, which is, along with Beauport, on the National Register of Historic Places.

References

Other sources
 Bohl, David; Nancy Curtis, Richard C. Nylander, Joseph Garland, Paul Hollister, Philip A. Hayden (1990). Beauport: The Sleeper McCann House (Society for the Preservation of New England Antiquities) 
 O'Gorman, James F. (Ed.) (2010). Drawing Toward Home: Designs for Domestic Architecture from Historic New England (Tilbury House Publishers)

External links
 Exterior view of Our Lady of Good Voyage Church, Gloucester, Mass.
 National Park Service, Our Lady of Good Voyage Church 
  Decoteau, Randall. "Beauport: a designer's showcase and escape." New England Antiques Journal, accessed April 21, 2015
Beauport, the Sleeper-McCann House web site

1884 births
1952 deaths
People from Vestfold
People from Tønsberg
20th-century American architects
Architects from Massachusetts
Architects of Roman Catholic churches
Norwegian emigrants to the United States